Controllable-slope soaring (also known as Walkalong gliding) is a type of slope soaring where a slope is made to follow a walkalong glider (a lightweight toy aircraft), both sustaining and controlling the glider's trajectory by modifying the wind in the vicinity of the airplane.

A controllable slope is any object which can be used to affect the air under the airplane: a piece of cardboard, the pilot's hands or even head. The controllable slope is usually manipulated by a person following the glider in flight (please see photo at right).

Controllable-slope soaring allows a glider to achieve sustained flight without the need for an onboard aircraft engine or onboard flight control system.

See also 
 Gliding flight
 History of human-powered aircraft
 Orographic lift
 Ridge lift
 Soaring
 Walkalong glider

External links
 Method of Flying Toy Airplane and Means Therefor - a patent from the 1950s for a walkalong glider using controllable slope soaring.

 Principles of flying walkalong gliders using controllable slope soaring (Jersey Shores Middle School students)
 Controllable slope soaring: suitable aircraft and videos (Google sites)

Air sports
Aircraft controls
Gliding technology